Holbæk municipality is a municipality (Danish, kommune) in northwestern Region Sjælland on the island of Zealand (Sjælland) in Denmark. The municipality includes the island of Orø, and covers an area of 583 km², and has a total population of 72,810 (2022).  Its mayor is Christina Krzyrosiak Hansen, a member of the Social Democrats and the youngest mayor ever in Denmark. The main town and the site of its municipal council is the city of Holbæk. 
On 1 January 2007 Holbæk municipality was, as the result of  Kommunalreformen ("The Municipal Reform" of 2007), merged with existing Jernløse, Svinninge, Tornved, and Tølløse municipalities to form a new Holbæk municipality.

Politics
Holbæk's municipal council consists of 31 members, elected every four years. The municipal council has seven political committees.

Municipal council
Below are the municipal councils elected since the Municipal Reform of 2007.

Urban areas
The ten largest urban areas in the municipality are:

The town of Holbæk 

The number of inhabitants on 1 January: 
 1980 - 29,578
 1985 - 30,154
 1990 - 31,151
 1995 - 32,485
 1999 - 33,555
 2000 - 33,864
 2003 - 34,500

Image gallery

References

External links

Official website  
 Municipal statistics: NetBorger Kommunefakta, delivered from KMD aka Kommunedata (Municipal Data)
 Municipal mergers and neighbors: Eniro new municipalities map

 
Municipalities of Region Zealand
Municipalities of Denmark
Populated places established in 2007